Sibson may refer to:

Places
 Sibson, Cambridgeshire
 Sibson, Leicestershire
 Peterborough/Sibson Airport, also known as Sibson aerodrome, near Peterborough, Cambridgeshire

People
 Gareth Sibson (born 1977), British writer, broadcaster and lawyer
 Harry Sibson (1919–2010)
 Francis Sibson (1814–1876), British physician and anatomist
 John Sibson (1930–2014), Australian politician
 Richard B. Sibson (1911–1994), New Zealand ornithologist
 Richard H. Sibson (born 1945), New Zealand geologist
 Robin Sibson (1944–2017), British mathematician and educator
 Tony Sibson (born 1958), British professional boxer
 Ray Sibson (1951–Date),English

Anatomy
 Sibson's aortic vestibule, the aortic vestibule
 Sibson's fascia, the suprapleural membrane
 Sibson's aponeurosis, the suprapleural membrane
 Sibson's groove, formed by the prominent lower border of the pectoralis major muscle
 Sibson's muscle, the scalenus minimus muscle